The 2015 Nordic Opening or the fifth Ruka Triple was the 6th edition of the Nordic Opening, an annual cross-country skiing mini-tour event. The three-day event was the first competition round of the 2015–16 FIS Cross-Country World Cup.

World Cup points distribution 
The winners of the overall standings were awarded 200 World Cup points and the winners of each of the three stages were awarded 50 World Cup points.

A total of 350 points was possible to achieve if one athlete won all three stages and the overall standings.

Overall standings

Overall leadership by stage

References 

2015–16 FIS Cross-Country World Cup
2015
2015 in cross-country skiing
November 2015 sports events in Europe